Ngudu is a town in the Kwimba District of the Mwanza Region in northwestern Tanzania. The town is the location of the district headquarters of Kwimba District. In 2016 the Tanzania National Bureau of Statistics report there were 31,123 people in the ward, from 27,630 in 2012.

Villages 
The ward has 14 villages.

 Kimwaga Busabi
 Chamhela
 Ngudu mjini
 Kakora
 Igoma
 Sokoni
 Ngudulugulu
 Budula
 Bugakama
 Ngumo
 Shuleni
 Ilamba
 Kilyaboya
 Welamasonga

References

Populated places in Mwanza Region